Cāngdì ( "Green Deity" or "Green Emperor") of Dōngyuèdàdì ( "Great Deity of the Eastern Peak") is the manifestation of the supreme God associated with the essence of wood and spring, for which he is worshipped as the god of fertility. The Bluegreen Dragon ( Qīnglóng) is both his animal form and constellation, and as a human he was Tàihào  (Fu Xi). His female consort is the goddess of fertility Bixia. His astral body is Jupiter.

Names 
Cāngdì ( "Green Deity" or "Green Emperor") goes by several other names such as Cāngshén ( "Green God"), also known as Qīngdì ( "Blue Deity" or "Bluegreen Deity") or Qīngshén ( "Bluegreen God"), and cosmologically as the Dōngdì ( "East Deity") or Dōngyuèdàdì ( "Great Deity of the Eastern Peak")

Overview 
The Confucian text, the Rites of Zhou, discusses the concept of the so-called "Wufang Shangdi". The History, quoted in the Kokuyo, refers to the following: Cangdi (or Qingdi), Huangdi, Heidi, Chidi, and Baidi. The names of the five emperors are not specified in the literature. The name of the Green Emperor is judged to be "Ling Wei Yang".

Dongyue Emperor

As Dōngyuèdàdì ( "Great Deity of the Eastern Peak", which is Mount Tai) Cangdi is worshipped as a Daoist deity of the sacred mountain Mount Tai. He is also considered significant in Chinese Buddhism. 

Since ancient times, Mount Tai has been seen as a place where the spirits of the dead gather, so the god of Mount Tai was thought to be the supreme deity of the underworld and govern the lifespan and status of humans in this world. In Daoism it is often said that he is the grandson of the Jade Emperor.

During the Han dynasty Emperors performed the Feng Shan ceremony on Mount Tai. At this time the ceremony was considered highly important and completing Feng Shan allowed the emperor to receive the mandate of heaven. Having started in 219 BC, by Qin Shihuang after unifying China

Over time the role of the Dongyue Emperor expanded moving from a local deity to a deity associated with life and death as a whole

The ritual of the storming of the city (打城) is performed in Taiwan and associated Dongyue Emperor, demonstrating this shift
Deities in Chinese folk religion
Deities in Taoism
Chinese gods
Jovian deities

Literature

The Beginning of the Ji Zhou Period 
The Etiquette and Ceremonial notes state that Jiang Shu, a later concubine of Emperor Xuan, became pregnant when she stepped on the giant footprints of Emperor Qing and gave birth to Huji, who became the founder of the Zhou dynasty.

See Also 
 Taihao
 Wufang Shangdi
 Dongyue Emperor

 Mount Tai
 Feng Shan

 Mount Tai
 Dongyue Temple
 King Father of the East
 King Yan

References

Works cited
 

Characters in Chinese mythology
Wufang Shangdi